Still I Rise: A Cartoon History of African Americans is a book by co-authored by Roland Owen Laird Jr. and Taneshia Nash Laird, and illustrated by Elihu Adolfo Bey. First published in September 1997, it was the first book to tell the vivid history of African Americans in one 200+ page cartoon narrative. Still I Rise covers the history of black people in America between the time periods of 1618, when the first skilled African craftspeople and farmers were brought over as indentured servants, to the Million Man March of 1995.

Cartoonist Bey and the Lairds analyze such topics as militancy, separatism, and integration, focusing on leaders such as Harriet Tubman, Fredrick Douglass, and Martin Luther King. The historically accurate book shows how Black Americans have persevered despite overwhelming odds.

Authors’ and Illustrator Background 

Roland and Taneshia Laird

Roland Laird passed away in 2013. Roland Laird grew up in New York, and graduated from Brown University. At Brown, he co-founded the NY Chapter of Brown University’s Page Black Alumni Council. Roland Laird is the founder and CEO of Posro Media, an entertainment production company that explores African American history and culture in a variety of formats, including comics, books, radio, video, and film. Posro projects' positive imagery is designed to stand in sharp counterpoint to the mass media's often unrealistic and misleading portraits of the African American community. Roland’s wife, Taneshia Nash Laird is a co-author of the book Still I Rise. Taneshia graduated from Baruch College in New York City, and was the marketing director for Posro Media, the company founded by her husband. Taneshia currently lives in West Windsor, New Jersey with her two daughters

Elihu Adofo Bey

Elihu Adofo Bey is the illustrator for Still I Rise. Elihu started reading comic books when he was 6, and has been drawing ever since. Bey has previously stated that black comic artists traditionally have drawn white characters or, at best, black characters who fall into the superhero stereotype. "I want my drawings to convey emotion and spirituality," he said. "I want to portray black people as they really are." 
 
Charles Johnson

Charles Johnson is responsible for the introduction of the book. Charles Johnson is the author of four novels Faith and the Good Thing (1974), Oxherding Tale (1982), Middle Passage (1990), and Dreamer (Scribner, 1998). A former director of the creative writing program at the University of Washington, he has written over 20 screenplays, published over 50 reviews, and has lectured in 9 countries as well as being a  regular speaker at American campuses. Charles Johnson points out in his introduction, the history of African American cartooning runs very deep, yet is almost unknown. “Still I Rise is a great contribution. It not only tells history, it makes history.”

Plot Summary 

Still I Rise begins with an introduction by Charles Johnson about black cartoonists and the subjects they dealt with. The book uses two elderly narrators, one male and one female, to take the reader through time. The female narrator has a bit of black nationalism, while the male narrator has a more balanced view of America in terms of race relations. The book beings to depict African American history starting in 1618. Around this time, in an effort to stem the rising cost of European indentured servants, Africans willing to indenture themselves were starting to be imported. These African servants did very well for themselves because they were more skilled than their European counterparts. The success of the African Americans sparked resentment in white indentured servants and free whites, who disliked the idea of a black man ordering around a white man. Due to their success, Africans started to buy out their contracts, which prompted owners to illegally lengthen African contracts to ban the buy-out problem. The action of the owners angered the African American servants, causing many of them to try and resort to the legal system or simply running away. However, neither of these options worked, and those who ran away had their contracts extended indefinitely.  Running out of options, the black servants resorted to rebellion in the form of Bacon's Rebellion in 1676. However, the rebellion was put down, and by 1677 slavery was official in all the colonies, with brutal overseers being hired to keep the slaves in line. Still I Rise continues through the history of slavery, outlining ways in which the slaves coped (or didn't cope) with their lot, as well as the hard-won successes of free blacks such as Benjamin Banneker, who "built the first striking clock wholly of American-made parts. From the beginning of the cartoon narrative, every major American black political movement, historical event, and organization is covered, as well as the achievements of African American inventors and businesspeople.

Reviews 
While the book was targeting adults as readers, many educators have used the book as a fun and different way to teach the history of African Americans to young people. Author Russell Banks (Rule of the Bone) says on the back of Still I Rise, It's not just the history of African-Americans it's the African American history of all Americans. Other well-known media sources such as Entertainment Weekly have praised the book, stating, From the arrival of the first slaves in colonial Virginia to the Million Man March on Washington, Still I Rise is an amazing condensed cartoon chronicle of African Americans that's aimed primarily at adults and prefaced with an introductory history of black cartoonists the Lairds have packed an epic quantity of information into this engaging, well-written volume.

See also
 Still I Rise: A Graphic History of African Americans, an updated version

Notes

1997 non-fiction books
Books about African-American history
Collaborative non-fiction books